Ali Maiga Halidu is a Ghanaian politician and member of the Seventh Parliament of the Fourth Republic of Ghana representing the Dormaa West Constituency in the Brong-Ahafo Region on the ticket of the New Patriotic Party.

Early life 
Ali Maiga Halidu was born on March 11, 1980. He is from the Nkrankwanta, in the Brong Ahafo Region.

Education 
Halidu acquired his bachelor's degree at the University of Cape Coast; he then furthered his education with a Master of Philosophy at the Cambridge in the United Kingdom.

Career 
Halidu worked as a teaching assistant at the University of Cape Coast for a year and then he worked as a professional teacher with the Ghana Education Service for a year from 2006 to 2007. He became a regulatory officer for the foods and agriculture authority for 3 years . He is currently a development consultant and a full-time politician.

Politics 
In the 2016 general elections Halidu contested and won the parliamentary seat for the Dormaa West Constituency in the Brong-Ahafo Region, on the ticket of the New Patriotic Party. He obtained 8,422 votes out of the 16,725 valid votes cast representing 50.88% of the votes.

Personal life 
Ali Maiga Halidu is married with six children.

References

Ghanaian MPs 2017–2021
1980 births
Living people
Ghanaian Muslims
New Patriotic Party politicians
University of Cape Coast alumni